David Copperfield is a 1935 American film released by Metro-Goldwyn-Mayer based upon Charles Dickens' 1850 novel The Personal History, Adventures, Experience, & Observation of David Copperfield the Younger (though a number of characters and incidents from the novel were omitted).

The story was adapted by Hugh Walpole from the Dickens novel, and the film was directed by George Cukor from a screenplay by Howard Estabrook and Lenore J. Coffee, who was not credited.

The novel was adapted for three silent film versions prior to this, the first sound production.

Plot
David's father dies before his birth and therefore the young man is forced to spend his childhood without the presence of a father figure. He finds valid support in his mother and housekeeper Peggotty. David's mother, however, feels the need to have a husband and therefore marries Mr. Murdstone, a severe and insensitive man, and welcomes his sister into the house; she proves to be even more insensitive than her brother.

When David's mother dies, Murdstone sends David to London to work in his family's wine bottling plant. During this time he is assisted by the Micawber family and forms a close friendship with its members. Mr. Micawber, with his courtly language and with his head a little in the air, is unable to look after the expenses of the house and gets into debt; at this point David decides to run away from London. After a thousand adventures, he reaches Dover on foot, where his great-aunt, Betsie Trotwood, lives. His aunt welcomes him together with her roommate Mr. Dick and they send him to boarding school in Canterbury, where he rents a room with the lawyer Wickfield and forms a sincere friendship with Wickfield's daughter, Agnes.

David meets Dora Spenlow at the ballet and falls in love, eventually marrying her. Dora is young and flighty and inept at running a household, and dies not long after their marriage. David and Micawber then help to unmask Uriah Heep as the forger and cheat that he is and return Wickfield's firm to its rightful owner. David and Agnes end the film finally expressing their love for each other.

Production

David O. Selznick dearly wanted to film David Copperfield, as his Russian father, Lewis J. Selznick, had learned English through it, and read it to his sons every night.  After failing to dissuade Selznick from the project, Louis B. Mayer, his father-in-law and employer, agreed that MGM would underwrite the production provided his star child contract actor, Jackie Cooper, was cast in the role of the young David. Selznick fought to remain true to the novel's origins and prevailed, and the role went to Freddie Bartholomew after an extensive talent search in Canada and Great Britain by Selznick and George Cukor.

Cedric Gibbons designed a recreation of 19th century London on the MGM backlot. The scenes set outside Aunt Betsey's house atop the white cliffs of Dover were filmed at Malibu. MGM even filmed the exterior of Canterbury Cathedral, which only appears in the film for less than a minute. Special effects, including many matte shots, were by Slavko Vorkapić.

Charles Laughton was originally cast in the role of Mr. Micawber, and was authentically made up with a bald cap, since Dickens describes the character as hairless. After two days' work, he disliked his performance in the dailies and asked to be replaced. It was said at the time that "he looked as though he were about to molest the child."

Selznick released Laughton, who, in turn, recommended comedian and Dickens scholar W. C. Fields for the part. A clause in Fields' contract stated that he had to play the part with a British accent, but as he had difficulty learning the lines and had to read off cue cards he thus speaks in his own accent in the role. His defense: "My father was an Englishman and I inherited this accent from him! Are you trying to go against nature?!" This is the only film where Fields does not ad lib, and he plays the character in a straightforward manner (although he did want to add a juggling sequence; when this was denied, an anecdote about snakes, which was also denied). Director George Cukor said that when Fields did make a suggestion for a visual bit, such as accidentally dipping his quill in a teacup instead of an inkwell, it was always within the parameters of the character. The result was one of the finest performances of that year.

Cast

(in order of appearance)

 Edna May Oliver as Betsey Trotwood
 Elizabeth Allan as Clara Copperfield
 Jessie Ralph as Clara Peggotty
 Harry Beresford as Dr. Chillip
 Freddie Bartholomew as David Copperfield as a boy
 Basil Rathbone as Edward Murdstone
 Hugh Walpole as the vicar
 Herbert Mundin as Barkis, coachman
 John Buckler as Ham Peggotty
 Faye Chaldecott as Little Em'ly as a child
 Una O'Connor as Mrs. Gummidge
 Lionel Barrymore as Dan'l Peggotty
 Violet Kemble Cooper as Jane Murdstone
 Elsa Lanchester as Clickett, Micawber's maid
 Jean Cadell as Emma Micawber
 W. C. Fields as Wilkins Micawber
 Lennox Pawle as Mr. Dick
 Renee Gadd as Janet, Aunt Betsey's maid
 Marilyn Knowlden as Agnes Wickfield as a child
 Lewis Stone as Mr. Wickfield
 Roland Young as Uriah Heep
 Frank Lawton as David Copperfield as a young man
 Madge Evans as Agnes Wickfield as a woman
 Hugh Williams as James Steerforth
 Maureen O'Sullivan as Dora Spenlow
 Florine McKinney as Little Em'ly as a woman 
 Ivan F. Simpson as Littimer, Steerforth's servant
 Mabel Colcord as Mary Ann

Cast notes:
 Arthur Treacher has a cameo as the man with the donkey who steals young David's money, forcing him to walk from London to Dover.

Reception
The film was well-received upon its release in January 1935. Andre Sennwald of The New York Times called it "the most profoundly satisfying screen manipulation of a great novel the camera has ever given us." Variety wrote that it had "one of the most evenly good casts ever to have been assembled", with staging and costumes that were "almost always excellent." John Mosher of The New Yorker found the first half of the film "one of the superb things of the movies" and the second half more conventional, though "all of it is good." Mosher also praised the casting and opined that Freddie Bartholemew put on "one of the prettiest performances ever given on the screen by a youngster." David Copperfield topped the Film Daily year-end poll of 451 critics around the country as the best film of 1935.

David Copperfield was nominated for three Academy Awards, including Academy Award for Best Picture, Best Film Editing (Robert J. Kern), and Best Assistant Director (Joseph M. Newman), and was nominated for the Mussolini Cup for Best Foreign Film at the Venice Film Festival (losing out to Anna Karenina).

It was the 20th most popular film at the British box office in 1935-1936 after Modern Times, Lives of a Bengal Lancer, Mutiny on the Bounty, Top Hat, The Great Ziegfeld, The Scarlet Pimpernel, Mr Deeds Goes to Town, Show Boat, The Iron Duke, Love Me Forever, Sanders of the River, Dark Angel, The Ghost Goes West, Follow the Fleet, Swing Time, Things to Come, The 39 Steps, Clive of India, and Escape Me Never.

There were several notable differences in the film from the book. For instance, in the film David never attends Salem House boarding school, and so the characters he met there do not appear, with the exception of Steerforth, who instead made his appearance as head boy of David's school he attended after going to live with Betsey Trotwood.

It is shown in many countries on television at Christmas. It is rated with four out of four stars every year in Halliwell's Film Guide.

This was selected by The New York Times as one of the 1000 greatest movies ever made.

The film is referred to in the Dad's Army episode "The Deadly Attachment".

Box office
According to MGM records the film earned $2,969,000 at the box office worldwide and made a profit of $686,000.  It earned an additional $95,000 from a reissue in 1937-1938.

See also
 Lionel Barrymore filmography

References

Further reading
 Tibbetts, John C., and James M. Welsh, eds. The Encyclopedia of Novels Into Film (2nd ed. 2005) pp 89–91.

External links

 
 
 
 
 
 Charles Dicken's David Copperfield script, MSS 4068 at L. Tom Perry Special Collections, Brigham Young University

1935 films
Metro-Goldwyn-Mayer films
American historical drama films
1930s English-language films
Films directed by George Cukor
Films based on David Copperfield
American black-and-white films
Films set in London
1930s historical drama films
Films produced by David O. Selznick
Films scored by Herbert Stothart
1935 drama films
1930s American films